The Romanian Air Force 93rd Air Base was an air base located near Timișoara, at the Giarmata Airport (Traian Vuia International). The base was disbanded in August 2004 due to the Romanian Armed Forces reorganisation program and the retirement of the MiG-23s which were based here. 

The military sector of the Traian Vuia International Airport is currently an annex of the 71st Air Base hosting the 714th Helicopter Squadron (operating IAR-330L).

External links
  Order of Battle of the RoAF
  Unofficial Romanian Site

93
Buildings and structures in Timiș County
Military units and formations disestablished in 2004
2004 disestablishments in Romania